Sindel  is a village in the municipality of Avren, in Varna Province, northeastern Bulgaria. It's an important railway junction for the Varna-Sofia railway line, and the railway to the settlements of Dalgopol, Komunari, Asparuhovo and Karnobat.

References

Villages in Varna Province